Saturday Disney is a long running Australian children's television program which aired on the Seven Network in Australia for over 26 years, with the first episode going to air on 27 January 1990. The show was a television block which aired on Saturday mornings, consisting mainly of Disney television series dispersed between hosted content. The original presenters were Jeniene Mapp, James Sherry and Sofie Formica, and the final presenters were Nathan Morgan, Candice Dixon and Teigan Nash. Many hosts have gone on to achieve successful careers in Australian television.

On 5 September 2009, the show celebrated its 1,000th episode. Saturday Disney aired its final episode on 24 September 2016.

Hosts

  

Notes
 Saturday Disney had three hosts at any one time, always consisting of two females and one male.
 The presenters were also credited as segment producers, and they wrote and researched their own stories.
 The only exception of having more than three hosts on air at one time was whenever a co-host was leaving and their replacement was introduced on screen, either a number of weeks beforehand, or during the final episode of the co-host who was leaving.
 Shae Brewster was the longest-serving presenter in the history of the show. She hosted the show for three months short of eleven years.

Appearances by hosts after leaving the show
 Both Shelley Craft and Melanie Symons returned to the show as guests after their departures. Craft returned on 26 October 2002 to talk about her new hosting role on Perfect Match and via satellite on 29 October 2005 for the 800th episode. Symons returned on 2 August 2003 to promote Australia's Best Backyards. 
 Several hosts have appeared after their departure through old footage. On the 999th episode on 29 August 2009, footage of every previous presenter who had been on the show was aired, looking back at the show's then 19-year history.
 Sally Stanton was interviewed by Teigan Nash on 2 May 2015 at the Cinderella red carpet event. Stanton was reporting for Event TV.
 Melanie Symons, Daniel Widdowson, Shae Brewster, Sally Stanton and Jack Yabsley featured as guests in the final episode which aired 24 September 2016. James Sherry also appeared via a video message.

History
Part of the Seven Network's output deal and long-running relationship with Disney in the late 1980s was to adopt a local program to feature new animated series such as DuckTales mixed with local studio segments. This was part of an international franchise of programs in the global market to be named Disney Club, the Australian version being located in Brisbane. The producers of this version convinced Disney to allow them to use the Saturday Disney title to avert confusion with The Mickey Mouse Club, a title which seemed dated. The original set was designed to reflect Queensland architecture and make the viewers feel like they were visiting a friend's house on a Saturday morning. The set has since changed several times, the most recent set being introduced in February 2007.  Saturday Disney was originally filmed at BTQ-7 from 1990 until 1997, when it moved to its new production base at ATN-7 in Sydney. It was originally produced by Buena Vista Television in conjunction with Seven.

On 5 September 2009, the show celebrated its 1,000th episode. The episode was filmed on location at Disneyland to celebrate. A week prior to this, footage of every previous host who had been on the show was aired, looking back at the show's then 19-year history.

Shae Brewster hosted her final episode on 27 July 2013, becoming the longest-serving host in the history of the program. She presented the show for three months short of eleven years, first joining in 2002.

The final episodes of Saturday Disney were filmed on 26 August 2016. TV Tonight reported that the show would be ending before the news was confirmed by a spokesperson for Seven. The final episode aired on 24 September 2016 and featured guest appearances by former presenters Melanie Symons, Daniel Widdowson, Shae Brewster, Sally Stanton and Jack Yabsley. James Sherry also appeared via a video message. David Knox of TV Tonight reported the cancellation of the program was the result of a "change in direction" under a new executive producer in charge of children's programming for Seven.

Format
As a main feature, Saturday Disney originally included three Disney programs dispersed throughout the course of a two-hour episode. From 2012 to 2016, Saturday Disney featured five programs over the course of a three-hour episode. The programs shown regularly rotated around the schedule, and were a mixture of animated cartoons and live action comedies, which were more common after the premiere of Hannah Montana in 2007. There were three hosts of Saturday Disney, who lived in the 'Disney House' and introduced the programs along with performing other activities such as cooking, craft, science segments, interviews and special appearances by guests, usually celebrities, and occasionally live animals. Occasionally, the show was shot entirely on location, where the hosts explored certain cities such as Coffs Harbour or places such as Disneyland for the episode's entirety.

Feature stories produced by and starring the hosts were also included, which were usually articles about places, activities and events, interviews with celebrities or red carpet events. This format has been likened to magazine-style edu-tainment shows. In some stories, the hosts adapted certain characters used as a substitute for themselves presenting the article. Another type of the stories were recurring mini-series with the hosts acting as characters, which air occasionally. Some recurring series from the past included Hazard Man (1990s), The Transfreezers (2000–2001), Tell Tale Trio (2002–2004) and the Secret Agents (2010–2011). A Page in Time (2006), introduced a style of serialised drama, depicting three children returning to 1850s. More recent series such as Danger Island (2009), Race Around the Island (2010) and The Assistant (2014) took on the reality genre, parodying American series Survivor, The Amazing Race, and The Apprentice respectively.

A Double Dog Dare was featured in every episode, where each host took turns (one each week) to complete ridiculous, embarrassing or challenging tasks which may have resulted in eating unusual food punishments upon failure, regularly ingredients mixed in a blender. Ideas for dares and punishments were regularly sent in by viewers. This popular segment was a prominent feature of the show for many years.

Each week there was also a chosen Letter of the Week, which could be letters, drawings, or art sent in by viewers. Winners usually received many prizes, and the artwork was displayed around the set. Throughout the course of the program, emails from viewers were also read out.

Time slot

The program's time slot since the show's inception in 1990 was always every Saturday from 7:00 am until 9:00 am on Seven unless there were interruptions by sporting or news events. Further Disney programming would continue to air after Saturday Disney.

From 4 September 1993 to 2001, Saturday Disney aired for an extra half-hour until 9:30am to include cartoons such as The New Adventures of Winnie the Pooh and The Little Mermaid, or C classified programming such as Crash Zone, Squiggle Vision and Science Court. However, the extra programme would be listed separately on TV guides and feature minimal hosted content.

On 4 July 2009, the show moved to the earlier time slot of 6:30 am to 8:30 am. However, the show returned to the previous time of 7:00 am to 9:00 am on 31 October 2009.

It was announced on 8 February 2010, that beginning 13 February 2010, the show would be moved to the later time slot of 9:00 am to 11:00 am, to make way for Weekend Sunrise.

It was announced on 17 March 2012 that, beginning 31 March 2012, the show would be moved to 7TWO and return to the original 7:00 am to 9:00 am time slot with a new look and logo, to make way for The Morning Show. On 12 May 2012, the regular length of Saturday Disney was extended to three hours with a time slot of 7:00 am to 10:00 am.

On 1 September 2012, Saturday Disney moved to the new time slot of 6:00 am to 7:00 am on Seven, then from 7:00 am to 9:00 am on 7TWO, the three hours now airing across both channels.

On 19 March 2016, the program's secondary channel changed from 7TWO to 7flix, airing from 6:00 am to 7:00 am on Seven, then from 7:00 am to 9:00 am on 7flix. The program remained in this slot until its final episode.

Reception

At the time of its final episode, Saturday Disney was the twentieth-longest-running program in Australia, and the fifth-longest-running children's program in Australia.

Viewership

In 2005, Saturday Disney had an average of 196,000 viewers (in the 0–14 age group alone) and was the number-one-rating children's program on commercial television for people aged 0 to 14.

Saturday Disney was the fifth-highest-rating children's program on free television in 2006, averaging 274,425 viewers over 48 broadcasts. In 2008, the program's yearly average viewing audience had ballooned to 395,000 (combining metro and regional audiences), ranking as the eighth-most-watched children's program. Saturday Disney ranked as the fourth-highest-rating children's program in 2009, averaging 368,000 viewers across both metro and regional audiences over 48 weeks.

However, the final episode on 24 September 2016 was comparatively only watched by 41,000 on Seven (6:00 am to 7:00 am) and 24,000 on 7flix (7:00 am to 9:00 am).

Awards

On 18 March 2012, Saturday Disney was announced as a nominee for the 2012 Most Outstanding Children's Program Logie Award. The ceremony took place on 15 April 2012, and the award was presented by former Saturday Disney host Shelley Craft with Sam Moran. The nomination package featured footage from the episode which aired 13 August 2011, in which the hosts visited the Northern Territory. ABC3's My Place won the award.

Programming

1990s

 The Adventures of Mickey & Donald
 Adventures of the Gummi Bears
 Aladdin
 Bonkers
 Chip 'n Dale Rescue Rangers
 Darkwing Duck
 Doug
 DuckTales
 Goof Troop
 Jungle Cubs
 The Little Mermaid
 Marsupilami
 The Mighty Ducks
 The New Adventures of Winnie the Pooh
 Nightmare Ned
 Pepper Ann
 Quack Pack
 Raw Toonage
 Recess
 Science Court
 Squiggle Vision
 TaleSpin
 Timon & Pumbaa
 The Wuzzles

2000s

 101 Dalmatians: The Series
 American Dragon: Jake Long
 Brandy & Mr. Whiskers
 Buzz Lightyear of Star Command
 The Buzz on Maggie
 Crash Zone
 Dave the Barbarian
 The Emperor's New School
 Fillmore!
 Hannah Montana
 Hercules
 House of Mouse
 JONAS
 Kim Possible
 The Legend of Tarzan
 Lilo and Stitch: The Series
 Lloyd in Space
 Mickey Mouse Works
 PB&J Otter
 Phineas and Ferb
 The Proud Family
 The Replacements
 Sabrina
 Teacher's Pet
 Teamo Supremo
 The Weekenders
 Wizards of Waverly Place

2010s

 A.N.T. Farm 
 Art Attack
 Austin & Ally
 Crash & Bernstein
 Dog with a Blog
 Fish Hooks
 Gravity Falls
 Good Luck Charlie
 I Didn't Do It
 I'm in the Band
 Jake and the Never Land Pirates
 Jessie
 Jonas Brothers: Living the Dream
 Kick Buttowski: Suburban Daredevil
 Kickin' It
 Kirby Buckets
 Lab Rats
 Liv and Maddie
 Mighty Med
 Pair of Kings
 Penn Zero: Part-Time Hero
 PrankStars
 Randy Cunningham: 9th Grade Ninja
 Shake it Up
 Sonny with a Chance
 So Random!
 Ultimate Spider-Man
 Wander Over Yonder
 Win, Lose or Draw
 Zeke and Luther

See also

 List of longest-running Australian television series

References

External links
Archived Saturday Disney Site
Saturday Disney Adventure Blog
 Saturday Disney at the National Film and Sound Archive

Australian children's television series
Television series by Disney
7two original programming
7flix original programming
Television programming blocks in Australia
1990 Australian television series debuts
2016 Australian television series endings
2000s Australian television series
Television shows set in Brisbane
Television shows set in Sydney
English-language television shows
Saturday mass media
Television programming blocks